Text-to-Pledge (TTP) is a mobile devices program for pledging charitable contributions. The technology is generally employed by non-profit organizations to increase donations at live fundraising events in the United States.

Use 
TTP  is most commonly used by charities at gala events. The program allows guests to use their mobile device to pledge  to prospective charities via text message.

Text-to-Pledge provides on-screen content, including interactive text messaging and impact visuals, to encourage mobile giving. Event can choose to display their name, donation amount and a brief message when they donate or can choose to give anonymously.

According to an article published by Mobile Commerce Daily, Sophist's Text-to-Pledge CEO Reed Baker explained the differentiating factor between apps and text-giving programs: “Apps require access… The likelihood that an organization could convince 1,000 people, many of whom are unregistered guests of table sponsors, to download something to their phone is a lot lower than asking all of these people to use something they use every day, and may even be using while you ask — that something would be text messaging.”Baker provides fundraising consulting for his clients  For example, Baker recommended running the Text-to-Pledge program during dinner and asking a well-known figure to announce the opportunity to give on stage.

History 

Baker founded Text-to-Pledge in 2008. Text-to-Pledge was nominated for a BizBash Event Style Award in the Best Fresh Idea category in 2008 and 2009. Since its founding, the program has raised in excess of $25 million for charity events around the United States.

References 

Charity fundraisers